The Öresund Committee was an organisation which described itself as a platform for regional political collaboration in the Øresund region. The Øresund region comprises Sweden's most southerly province of Skåne and the Danish islands of Zealand, Lolland, Falster and Bornholm. The Øresund region has a total population of 3.7 million inhabitants.

The Öresund Committee was established in 1993 and worked as the platform for regional political cooperation in the Øresund Region, lobbying for Öresund interest at national and European level. The Committee worked across party lines in its efforts to solve important questions about the infrastructure, labor market, culture and popular support and is the "embassy" of the Öresund region.

The name used by the Öresund Committee for itself in both Danish and Swedish is Öresundskomiteen, which is a hybrid of its Danish language and the Swedish language names.

Organisation 
The members of the Öresund Committee were:

In Denmark:
The Capital Region and Region Zealand
The municipalities of Bornholm, Copenhagen, and Frederiksberg
Greater Copenhagen Forum for Local Municipalities

In Sweden:
Region Skåne
The municipalities of Landskrona, Lund, Helsingsborg, and Malmö

The Öresund Committee 
The members themselves elected their representatives and their deputies on the Öresund Committee. There were in total 36 representatives:  18 from Sweden and 18 from Denmark and the Committee met at least twice a year.

The Executive Committee 
Consists of 12 committee members; six from Sweden and six from Denmark and they meets at least four times a year.

The Öresund Committee Secretariat 
The Secretariat is based in Copenhagen and is responsible for bringing political decisions to fruition. The Öresund Committee is hosting ØresundDirekt and Interreg IVA.

Past activities 
In 2009 – 2010 the Öresund Committee highlighted four specific issues:
Dismantling cross-border obstacles that inhibit the labour market.
Investing in a new infrastructure for the region and analyzing the importance of tolls for the bridge across Öresund and transport costs for integration.
Strengthening good relations at the grassroots level and promote social and association contacts and cooperation across Öresund and thereby establish a cultural metropolis.
A new vision and strategy for the Öresund Region 2025

References 
The Öresund Committee,

External links 
ØresundDirekt, 
Øresundsbron, 

Political organizations based in Denmark
Scania
1993 establishments in Denmark
1993 establishments in Sweden
Organizations based in the Øresund Region